The Scarlet Wooing is a 1920 British silent drama film directed by Sidney Morgan and starring Eve Balfour, George Keene and Marguerite Blanche. The screenplay concerns an author who writes a scandalous novel in order to raise funds for his daughter's operation.

Cast
 Eve Balfour as Mrs. Raeburn  
 George Keene as Paul Raeburn  
 Marguerite Blanche as Nancy  
 Joan Morgan as May Raeburn  
 George Bellamy as Dr. Andrew Hooper  
 Harry Newman as Roland Standish  
 Arthur Walcott as John Pollock  
 Edward Godal as Clubman  
 Nigel Black-Hawkins as Clubman

References

Bibliography
 Low, Rachael. The History of the British Film 1918-1929. George Allen & Unwin, 1971.

External links
 

1920 films
British drama films
British silent feature films
Films directed by Sidney Morgan
1920 drama films
Films set in England
British black-and-white films
1920s English-language films
1920s British films
Silent drama films